Roy Pounder (born 1944) is a British medical doctor and entrepreneur. He was Professor of Medicine at the Royal Free and University College Medical School in London and clinical vice president of the Royal College of Physicians of London. He is now a London University Emeritus Professor of Medicine.

Controversially, Pounder hired and mentored disgraced researcher Andrew Wakefield, who in 2010 was struck off the medical register by the General Medical Council, and introduced him 
to reporters at a notorious press conference at the Royal Free on 26 February 1998.  At this event, Pounder helped to launch what became an intractable, international health crisis over the measles, mumps and rubella, MMR vaccine, stating with regard to the three-in-one inoculation: "In hindsight it may be a better solution to give the vaccinations separately." Pounder was later reported in the British Medical Journal as having been allocated stock in a business venture with Wakefield to sell products exploiting the public alarm.

Pounder has edited over 20 textbooks. He is one of the founding co-editors of the journal Alimentary Pharmacology & Therapeutics, and editor-in-chief of GastroHep.com. His main research interests have included the development of drugs for controlling gastric acid secretion, and the pathogenesis and management of inflammatory bowel disease. His  interests have included the effects of night time shiftwork on junior doctors, and the design and implementation of junior doctors' rotas. He is a governor of St. Paul's School, London, and chairman of RotaGeek.com.

References

External links
 

Academics of University College London
20th-century British medical doctors
Living people
1944 births